The armored bulldozer is a basic tool of combat engineering. These combat engineering vehicles combine the earth moving capabilities of the bulldozer with armor which protects the vehicle and its operator in or near combat. Most are civilian bulldozers modified by addition of vehicle armor/military equipment, but some are tanks stripped of armament and fitted with a dozer blade. Some tanks have bulldozer blades while retaining their armament, but this does not make them armored bulldozers as such, because combat remains the primary role — earth moving is a secondary task.

World War II

The first armored bulldozer (D7A) was developed by the British during World War II. This was a conventional Caterpillar D7 bulldozer fitted with armor to protect the driver and the engine. The work was carried out by Jack Olding & Company Ltd of Hatfield. The bulldozer was one of several strange armored vehicles that were collectively referred to as "Hobart's Funnies" and were operated by the British 79th Armoured Division in support of armored assaults.

The bulldozers were produced in preparation for the Battle of Normandy with the tasks of clearing the invasion beaches of obstacles and quickly making roads accessible by clearing rubble and filling in bomb craters.

As Allied armies advanced through Europe, the armored bulldozer was found to be too slow—there was a need for well-armored, obstacle clearing vehicle that was fast enough to keep up with tank formations. This need was met by the Centaur Bulldozer—a Centaur tank with the turret removed and a bulldozer blade fitted. Centaur bulldozers were still in use with the British Army at the time of the Korean War.

Modern use

Modern armored bulldozers are often based on the Caterpillar D7 and D9. The attributes that make the D9 popular for major construction projects make it desirable for military applications as well.  It has been particularly effective for the Israel Defense Forces (IDF) and for the United States armed forces (the Marine Corps and the US Army) and the Canadian Army  in Iraq, both using an armor kit developed and manufactured by Israel. Following the success of the armored D9, Caterpillar Defense Products started to manufacture and sell armored bulldozers, mainly for the United States Armed Forces.

Israel

The Israeli Armored D9 — nicknamed Doobi (lit. teddy bear) — is a Caterpillar D9 bulldozer that was modified by the Israel Defense Forces, Israeli Military Industries and Israel Aerospace Industries to increase the survivability of the dozer in hostile environments and enable it to withstand heavy attacks.

It has a crew of two, an operator and a commander. It is operated by the TZAMA (צמ"ה = ציוד מכני הנדסי, Mechanical Engineering Equipment) units of the Israeli Engineering Corps.

The main IDF modification is the installation of an Israeli-made armor kit which provides armor protection to the mechanical systems and to the operator cabin. The operator and commander are protected inside an armored cabin ("the cockpit"), with bulletproof windows to protect against bombs, machinegun, and sniper fire. The IDF also developed a slat armor add-on to deflect RPG rounds. The fitted armor package adds roughly 15 additional tons to the production-line weight of the D9. The modified D9 bulldozers can be fitted with disparate features, such as crew-operated machine guns, smoke projectors, or grenade launchers.

The IDF uses the D9 for a wide variety of engineering tasks, including earthworks, digging moats, mounting sand barriers, building fortifications, rescuing stuck, overturned or damaged armored fighting vehicles (along with M88 Recovery Vehicle), clearing landmines, detonating improvised explosive devices and explosives, clearing terrain obstacles and opening routes for armored fighting vehicles and infantry, as well as structures demolition, including under fire.

During the Second Intifada the armored D9 bulldozer was an effective tool against Palestinian fighters, as they were almost impervious to Palestinian weapons and withstood even RPGs and belly charges with more than 100 kg and even half a ton of explosive. Therefore, they were used to open safe routes for IDF forces and detonate explosive charges. The bulldozer was used extensively to clear shrubbery and structures which could be used as cover.

Following several incidents where armed Palestinians barricaded themselves inside houses to prevent house demolition and killed soldiers attempting to breach the entries, the IDF developed "Noal Sir Lachatz" (נוהל סיר לחץ "Pressure Pot Regulation") in which D9s and other engineering vehicles were used to bring them out by razing the houses.

United States

During the first Gulf war the United States purchased tractor protection kits (TPK) from the Israel Military Industries (IMI) for their Caterpillar D7 bulldozers. The armored bulldozers were mainly used in mine clearing applications. During the preparation to the war in Iraq in 2003 the United States Army purchased several D9 armor kits from the IDF and used them to produce similarly fortified D9s. These have been used to clear destroyed vehicles from roads, dig moats, erect earthen-barriers, and construct field fortifications. D9s have also been used to raze houses which sheltered insurgent snipers. Military reports on the Conflict in Iraq say that the D9s were found very effective and "received highly favorable reviews from all that benefited from their use".

Other military forces
Other military forces, such as the Lebanese army and the Egyptian army, also used armored bulldozers, to suppress insurgency and support urban warfare.

The Soviet military developed dedicated dozer-blade-equipped armored vehicles, the IMR series, based on main battle tank chassis.

The Islamic State has used armoured bulldozers, including civilian bulldozers up-armoured with steel plate and slat armour, capable of withstanding small arms fire and even rocket propelled grenades, as SVBIED's or suicide vehicle-borne improvised explosive devices. The tonnes of explosives packed into these armoured bulldozers are capable of destroying entire buildings.

See also 

 Bob Semple tank
 Demining
 Engineering vehicles
 Israeli Engineering Corps
 Killdozer
 Rome plow

Notes and references

External links
 Caterpillar D9 armored bulldozer, Military-today.com
 IDF Armoured D9R Dozer, Army-technology.com
 Army's new D9 bulldozer digs into duty in Kuwait - The US army tests the armored D9R for the Iraqi campaign
 Caterpillar Bulldozers Are Leading the Fight Against the Islamic State, Popular Mechanics, June 2017

Israel Defense Forces
Military engineering vehicles
Military vehicles of Israel
Caterpillar Inc. vehicles
Tracked vehicles